Barbara Nekesa Oundo is a Ugandan politician and diplomat, who serves as Uganda's High Commissioner to South Africa, based in Pretoria. In that capacity, she also represents her country, to the nations of South Africa, Botswana, Namibia, Lesotho and Swaziland.

She previously served as the state minister for Karamoja affairs in the Cabinet of Uganda. She was appointed to that position on 27 May 2011. She replaced Janet Museveni, who was appointed minister for Karamoja affairs. Oundo has also served as the elected member of Parliament for Busia District women's representative in the 9th parliament (2011 to 2016).

Background and education
She was born in Busia District in the Eastern Region on 6 June 1984 to Mary Hadudu, mother to nine other girls and Edward Wabudi, a local councillor. She attended the Bubulo Girls School in Mbale for her middle school education (O-Level) and Mbogo High School in Kawempe for her high school studies (A-Level). In 2009, she graduated from Makerere University in Uganda with a Bachelor of Human Resources Management degree.

Career and family
Since 2007, she was married to Charles Oundo, a foreign service officer, whom she met while an undergraduate at Makerere University. They are the parents of two sons. In 2011, she successfully ran on the National Resistance Movement (NRM) political party ticket for the parliamentary Busia district women's constituency seat. In May 2011, she was appointed state minister for Karamoja affairs, reporting directly to Janet Museveni, Uganda's first lady and, at the time, minister for Karamoja affairs.

In 2017, she divorced her first husband, Charles Oundo. In December 2018, she was married to Hajji Suleiman Lumolo Mafabi, a businessman, based in Mbale, in the Eastern Region of Uganda. The private ceremony took place at their home in Muyenga, an upscale neighborhood in Kampala, Uganda's capital city. 

She is the current  appointed National Treasurer of the ruling National Resistance Movement (NRM) Amb.

Loss of political positions
In November 2015 during the NRM primaries, incumbent Oundo received 28,750 votes while her closest challenger, Nina Irene Nekesa Wandera, received 25,443 votes. Wandera then petitioned the party's electoral commission with alleged evidence of electoral malpractice by Oundo.

During the 2016 parliamentary elections, Oundo lost to incumbent Jane Nabulindo Kwoba, who ran as an independent. In the cabinet list released by the Office of the President on 6 June 2016, Oundo was not included.

References

External links
Full Ministerial Cabinet List, May 2011

Living people
People from Busia District, Uganda
Samia people
People from Eastern Region, Uganda
Members of the Parliament of Uganda
Makerere University alumni
1984 births
National Resistance Movement politicians
Women government ministers of Uganda
Government ministers of Uganda
21st-century Ugandan women politicians
21st-century Ugandan politicians
Women members of the Parliament of Uganda
High Commissioners of Uganda to South Africa
Ugandan women ambassadors